Manhattan may refer to one of several ships:

 , ship that made the first authorized United States visit to Tokyo Bay
 , a 1930s luxury liner
 , tanker constructed to pass the Northwest Passage

For other US ships of that name, see .

Ship names
New York City-related lists